Yemenia is the flag carrier airline of Yemen, based in Sanaa. It operates scheduled domestic and international passenger flights to destinations in Africa and the Middle East out of its hubs at Aden International Airport, and to a lesser extent Seiyun Airport.

History

Early years
Yemenia dates its origins back to Yemen Airlines, a company that was founded in the second half of the 1940s and owned by Ahmad bin Yahya, then King of Yemen. When the Yemen Arab Republic was proclaimed in 1962, Yemen Airlines was issued a new airline licence on 4 August of that year (which remains valid until today), thus becoming the flag carrier of the country, with its head office in the Ministry of Communication Building in Sana'a. In 1967, the airline entered a co-operation with United Arab Airlines, which lasted until 1972. During that period, it was known as Yemen Arab Airlines.

In September 1972 and following nationalisation Yemen Airlines was reorganised and renamed Yemen Airways Corporation (YAC). At March 1975 YAC had 60 employees; the airline's fleet consisted of four DC-6Bs and four DC-3s that served domestic destinations and an international network that included Asmara, Cairo, Djibouti, Dhahran, Jeddah and Kuwait. On lease from World Airways, YAC operated a pair of Boeing 737-200 aircraft for two and a half years until the carrier ordered an aircraft of the type in mid-1976. In early 1977, a new airline was jointly established by the governments of the Yemen Arab Republic and Saudi Arabia, with both countries holding 51% and 49% of the shares, respectively, and the name Yemen Airways was adopted on 1 July 1978. In April 1978, a two-year contract for the provision of two Boeing 707-320Cs that included the supply of aircrews and engineering support was signed with British Midland Airways (BMA). In July 1979, the carrier signed a three-year agreement with Pan Am for the provision of technical maintenance and personal training. Two de Havilland Canada Dash 7s were ordered. The unilateral cancellation of the contract signed with BMA by Yemen Airways led the British carrier to file a claim against the Yemeni airline, which resulted in the impoundment of one of its Boeing 727-200s.

At July 1980 the workforce was 750 and chairmanship was held by Shaif M. Saeed. By this time, five Boeing 727-200s, two Boeing 737-200s, one Douglas DC-6A and three DC-3s made up the airline's fleet. Domestic scheduled passenger services linked Sana'a with Baydhan, Hodeida, Mareb and Taiz; Abu Dhabi, Athens, Cairo, Damascus, Dhahran, Dubai, Jeddah, Karachi, Kuwait, Muscat, Rome and Sharjah were part of the international network. Cargo services were also undertaken. The two Dash 7s were part of the fleet by March 1985, along with five Boeing 727-200s and one Boeing 737-200, and the airline had expanded its route network to include Amsterdam, Bombay, Frankfurt, Larnaca and London-Gatwick. The number of employees had grown to 1,100.

When South Yemen was united with the Yemen Arab Republic to form today's Yemen in 1990, plans were made to form a single national airline by merging South Yemen's Alyemda into Yemenia. To achieve this, the shares held by Saudi Arabia were bought back by the government of Yemen in 1992. The merger took place in 1996.
Yemenia became an Airbus A310 operator in 1995 with two leased A310-200s; the introduction of the Airbus A310-300 followed in March 1997.

Development in the 2000s

At March 2000 the chairmanship was held by Hassan Sohbi and the number of employees was 4,017. The aircraft operated at this time consisted of three Airbus A310-300s, two Antonov An-26s, five Boeing 727-200 Advanced, one Boeing 737-200 Advanced, one Boeing 737-200C, four Dash 7s, two DHC-6 300s and two Lockheed C130H Hercules. The list of domestic destinations served at this time were Aden, Al Ghaydah, Ataq, Hodeidah, Riyan Mukalla, Sanaa, Seiyun, Socotra and Taiz, while Abu Dhabi, Addis Ababa, Amman, Asmara, Bahrain, Beirut, Cairo, Damascus, Dar es Salaam, Djibouti, Doha, Dubai, Frankfurt, Jeddah, Johannesburg, Karachi, Khartoum, London, Moroni, Mumbai, Nairobi, Paris, Riyadh, Rome and Sharjah comprised the international network. On lease from International Lease Finance Corporation (ILFC), the first Boeing 737-800 joined the fleet in May 2002. The first Airbus A330-200 entered the fleet in 2004 on lease from ILFC.

Since 2008, a number of safety actions by the European Union have been taken against Yemenia because of alleged poor maintenance standards in Yemen. In July 2009, France suspended the airworthiness certificates of two Yemenia Airbus A310 aircraft that were registered in the country. European services to Frankfurt were relaunched in December 2009. Since then, systematic inspections of Yemenia aircraft parked at EU airports are carried out, in order to assess and verify the safety standards. On 20 January 2010, then British Prime Minister Gordon Brown announced that, owing to concerns of terrorist activity in Yemen, flights between the UK and the country would be suspended, as long as the security situation would not improve.

2015–onwards
In March 2015, Yemenia was forced to suspend all flight operations until further notice due both to a military conflict that had Sanaʽa International Airport as a target of air raids and to restrictions over the Yemeni airspace. In August 2015, Yemenia reinstated flights to Aden International Airport, with the first flight originating from Saudi Arabia. The blockade was reinstated on 21 February 2016, and lifted on 14 November 2017, when the first commercial flight touched down at Aden International Airport. Flights were cancelled once again, this time for less than a week, resuming on 1 February 2018. According to The National newspaper, in November 2018 Yemenia announced that they would be seeking to resume flights from Aden International Airport to Dubai, Abu Dhabi, Muscat and Salalah in the Persian Gulf and Asmara, Moroni, and Djibouti in Africa, as well as leasing more aircraft. However, there has not been any addition to the destinations of Yemenia airlines (Cairo, Amman, Jeddah, Khartum and Mumbai).

In May 2020, during the COVID-19 pandemic in Yemen, Yemenia operated repatriation flights to Egypt, Jordan, and India. The airline received $1.15 million in compensation. In June 2020, Chairman Ahmed Masood Alwani announced that the airline's two Airbus A310s would be phased out.

On 16 May 2022, Yemenia resumed limited commercial operations out of Sanaa International Airport, its former main hub. The first Yemenia flight carried 151 passengers to the Jordanian capital Amman.

Corporate affairs

Headquarters
The head office is located in the Hassaba District, in Downtown Sanaʽa, however the building was destroyed by fire during fighting in May 2011. On 3 June the same year, during the 2011 Yemeni revolution, the building was again set on fire.

Destinations 

As of August 2022, Yemenia operates scheduled flights to five domestic and six international destinations with most originating at Aden International Airport and Seiyun Airport.

Fleet

Current fleet

, Yemenia has an all-Airbus fleet that consists of the following aircraft:

Fleet development

In 2008, during the Dubai Air Show, the carrier signed a contract for the purchase of ten Airbus A350-800s. The order was subsequently altered to include the larger -900 version. The A320 order was later restructured and four of them were converted to the A320neo.

Historical fleet
Over the years, the airline has operated the following aircraft types:

Incidents and accidents
Yemenia has experienced the following incidents and accidents including three hijackings:
On 3 November 1958, a Yemen Airlines (as the company was named at that time) Douglas C-47 Skytrain (registered YE-AAB) crashed near Poggiodomo in Italy, killing the eight people on board. The aircraft had been on a flight from Rome Ciampino Airport to Yemen with a planned stopover at Belgrade, carrying the Yemenite Under Secretary of Foreign Affairs.
On 19 March 1969, a Yemen Airlines C-47 (registered 4W-AAS) crashed near Ta'izz during a post-maintenance test flight, killing the four occupants. It turned out that the elevator of the aircraft did not work properly. Repair work had been done on that part, because it had been damaged some days earlier in a ground collision.
On 16 September 1971, another Yemen Airlines C-47 (registered 4W-ABI) crashed near Rajince, Serbia when it encountered severe icing conditions, killing the five people on board. The aircraft had been on a multi-stopover flight from Yemen to Europe and had just departed Belgrade Airport.
On 1 November 1972, a Yemen Airlines Douglas DC-3 (registered 4W-ABJ) was destroyed in a crash-landing at an airfield near Beihan.
On 25 August 1973, a Yemen Airlines Douglas DC-6 was hijacked during a passenger flight from Ta'izz to Asmara. The perpetrator forced the pilots to divert the aircraft with fifteen other passengers and six crew members on board to Kuwait Airport, for which a refueling stop at Djibouti Airport turned out to be necessary. In Kuwait, the hijacker surrendered to local police forces.
On 13 December 1973, a Yemen Airlines DC-3 (registered 4W-ABR) crashed near Ta'izz.
On 23 February 1975, a Yemen Airlines DC-3 was hijacked during a flight from Al Hudaydah to Sana'a and forced to land at an airport in Saudi Arabia. There, the aircraft was stormed and the perpetrator overpowered.
On 14 November 1978, a Yemen Airlines C-47 (registered 4W-ABY) was damaged beyond repair in a heavy landing at an airfield near Ma'rib.
 On 26 June 2000, a Yemenia Boeing 737-200C, registered 7O-ACQ, was damaged beyond repair when it veered off the runway upon landing at Khartoum International Airport following a cargo flight from Yemen.
 On 21 January 2001, Yemenia Flight 448, a Boeing 727-200 with 91 passengers and 10 crew on board, was hijacked 15 minutes into a flight from Sana'a to Ta'izz by an Iraqi man. The plane was forced to land at Djibouti–Ambouli International Airport, where the perpetrator was overpowered by the crew.
 On 1 August 2001, a Boeing 727-200 (registered 7O-ACW) was damaged beyond economic repair when it overran the runway upon landing at Asmara International Airport following a flight from Sana'a with 107 passengers and four crew on board, none of whom were significantly injured.
On 23 June 2007, a DHC-6 Twin Otter was damaged by gunfire at An Naeem Airstrip, killing one passenger.
The company's worst accident occurred on 30 June 2009, when Yemenia Flight 626 from Sana'a to Moroni, Comoros crashed into the sea shortly before landing. Of the 142 passengers and eleven crew that had been on the Airbus A310-300 with the registration 7O-ADJ, only a young girl survived the accident.
 In March 2015, a Boeing 747SP (registered 7O-YMN) which was operated in Yemenia branding for the government of Yemen was damaged by gunfire during a militia attack at Aden airport. A subsequent blaze destroyed the aircraft completely.
In December 2020, there was an attack at Aden Airport when a number of Yemeni cabinet ministers arrived in a Yemenia plane. At least 20 people were killed and several injured.

See also
Transport in Yemen

References

External links 

 

Airlines of Yemen
Arab Air Carriers Organization members
Airlines established in 1962
Government-owned airlines